Stephen Frederick Eustace Frost (born 28 December 1955) is an English actor and comedian.

Early life
Frost was born in Redruth, Cornwall, and is the son of the abstract artist Terry Frost and brother of painter Anthony Frost.

Career

Work with Mark Arden
Frost is known for his work in the 1980s with Mark Arden as part of the double act The Oblivion Boys on Saturday Live. Veterans of the alternative comedy scene, he and Arden appeared in The Young Ones, and later had their own TV series Lazarus and Dingwall on BBC2. They played the lead roles in the 1987 revival of Tom Stoppard's play, Rosencrantz and Guildenstern Are Dead at the Piccadilly Theatre. They also played two robbers in ‘Big Deal’ series 2, in the episode ‘Popping Across The Pond’.

In 1994 the Oblivion Boys starred opposite the comedy duo Raw Sex (Simon Brint and Rowland Rivron) in the partially-improvised comedy film There's No Business....

The duo appeared in a series of British TV advertisements ending with the catchphrase "I bet he drinks Carling Black Label". One spoofed the "launderette" commercial for Levi's in which Nick Kamen stripped to his underwear; in their pastiche, Arden and Frost played launderette customers who were stripped entirely, with just strategically placed books maintaining their modesty.

Solo work
Without Arden, Frost has appeared on BBC Radio 4's Just a Minute, and the improvisation show Whose Line Is It Anyway?. He has appeared on three episodes of Have I Got News for You (there was a 13-year gap between his second and third appearance) and on Never Mind the Buzzcocks. He also appeared as Dirk in Tony Bagley's series Married.

He played two small roles in Blackadder: a prison guard in the first-series episode "Witchsmeller Pursuivant", and the overly cheerful head of a firing squad in the episode "Corporal Punishment" of Blackadder Goes Forth. He also appeared in the British comedy series Mr. Bean, starring Rowan Atkinson, in the episode entitled "Mr. Bean Rides Again" in one of the skits where Mr. Bean is on a train.

In 2003 he appeared in Guy Masterson's sell-out production of 12 Angry Men alongside Bill Bailey.

Frost appeared alongside Tony Hawks and Angus Deayton in the 2012 feature film Playing the Moldovans at Tennis.

Currently
Frost is a regular on the London comedy circuit. He is also a veteran of the Edinburgh Festival Fringe and Glastonbury Festival.

Frost still appears regularly with The Comedy Store Players in The Comedy Store, London.

Filmography

Film

Television

Books
 Sit-Down Comedy (contributor to anthology, ed Malcolm Hardee & John Fleming) Ebury Press/Random House, 2003.  ;

References

External links

1955 births
Living people
English male television actors
English male comedians
People from Redruth
Male actors from Cornwall
20th-century English male actors
21st-century English male actors